Saybia is the debut EP by Danish rock band Saybia.

Track listing

Musicians
 Søren Huss – vocals, acoustic guitar
 Jeppe Langebek Knudsen – bass
 Palle Sørensen – drums
 Sebastian Sandstrøm – guitar
 Jess Jenson – keyboards

In other media
The song "Fool's Corner" was used on the soundtrack of the 2001 Danish film En kort en lang.

References

External links
International fansite
Official website

2001 EPs
Saybia EPs
EMI Records EPs